Culture Cry Wolf was a live band based in Minneapolis, Minnesota. Heavily involved in the Twin Cities hip hop scene, they blend ska, punk rock, reggae, and even doo-wop.

History
Culture Cry Wolf formed in 2009, after Mike Daly and Botzy met at a house party.

They released The Wesley Opus Sessions in August 2010. Their first music video for the single "Come Come" was released on August 29, 2010.

They spent the next year writing and recording their first full-length album, Dia de los Muertos. The album was self-released in November 2011. Several music videos have been released from this album, including: "Day of the Dead", "Sweet Marie", "Romeo", "Me, Myself and I", and "Second Wind" which features Sims of Doomtree which was premiered on the national publication "Baeble Music".

The band released The Sapient Sessions on May 14, 2013. The EP was produced by Sapient, and features guest verses by Astronautalis, Psalm One, Mac Lethal, Toki Wright and Maria Isa.

Culture Cry Wolf officially disbanded on May 18, 2013. Their release show for The Sapient Sessions served as their official farewell show.

Discography

Albums
 Dia de los Muertos (2011)

EPs
 The Wesley Opus Sessions (2010)
 The Sapient Sessions (2013)

Singles
 "Come Come" (2010)

References

External links
 
 Culture Cry Wolf on Bandcamp
 Culture Cry Wolf on YouTube
 Culture Cry Wolf on Twitter

Musical groups from Minnesota
Musical groups established in 2009
Alternative hip hop groups